Myriospora is a genus of lichens in the family Acarosporaceae. , Species Fungorum accepts 11 species in the genus.

Species 
 Myriospora benedarensis
 Myriospora dilatata
 Myriospora fulvoviridula
 Myriospora hassei
 Myriospora myochroa
 Myriospora rhagadiza
 Myriospora scabrida
 Myriospora signyensis
 Myriospora smaragdula
 Myriospora tangerina
 Myriospora westbergii

References

 Hue, Nouv. Arch. Mus. Hist. Nat. Paris 1: 164 (1909). (from Knudsen 2007)
 Hue (1909) Lichenes morphologice et anatomice disposuit (continuatio). Nouv. Archiv. du Muséum d'Histoire Naturelle de Paris\Nouv. Arch. Mus. hist. nat. Paris 1: 111–166.
 Harris, R.C. and Knudsen, K. (2005) The genus Myriospora. Opuscula Philolichenum 3 1–4. [1]
 Knudsen, K. (2007) Myriospora (pp. 254–255) In: Nash III, T.H., Gries, C., and Bungartz, F. (eds.), Lichen Flora of the Greater Sonoran Desert Region, Vol. 3. Lichens Unlimited, Arizona State University, Tempe, Arizona, 567 pages.
 Magnusson, A.H. (1929)[1930] A monograph of the genus Acarospora. Kongl. Svenska Vetenskaps-Akade-miens Handlingar, Stockholm, Ser. 3, 7: 1–400.

External links
 
 
 Myriospora at Mycobank

Acarosporales
Lichen genera
Lecanoromycetes genera